Stranded is a 1935 American drama film directed by Frank Borzage and starring Kay Francis, George Brent and Patricia Ellis.

The film's sets were designed by the art director Anton Grot.

Plot
Lynn Palmer is a volunteer for Travelers Aid in San Francisco who goes out of her way to help for immigrants, travelers, the unemployed and the homeless.  Mack Hale is a construction manager on the Golden Gate Bridge (which would not be completed until 1937), who comes to Lynn's station seeking information about a worker he wants to hire.  Lynn and Mack are attracted to each other, despite their different personalities and outlook.  Lynn's roommate, Velma Tuthill, is the daughter of one of the bridge's backers and is also attracted to Mack.

Lynn and Mack date, even though he is often put off by how she turns her attentions to people he thinks are unworthy.  In the meantime, Mack comes under pressure from a protection racket mob led by "Sharkey".  Sharkey bribes and manipulates some workers to create dangerous conditions that cause Mack to fire them.  Though Mack has proposed marriage, Lynn rejects his demand that she quit her work helping others.  Mack, however, is threatened with a walkout by the workers over his apparent callousness and accusations that he caused a worker's death, all instigated by Sharkey.  At a workers' meeting, Lynn helps to expose Sharkey's plot and clear Mack's name with the men, who turn on Sharkey.  Mack admits to Lynn that he was wrong to look down on others less fortunate than himself, and the two are reunited with the promise that they can each devote themselves to the work each cares for.

Cast
 Kay Francis as Lynn Palmer
 George Brent as Mack Hale
 Patricia Ellis as Velma Tuthill
 Donald Woods as John Wesley
 Robert Barrat as Stanislaus Janauschek
 Barton MacLane as Sharkey
 Joseph Crehan as Johnny Quinn
 William Harrigan as Updyke
 Henry O'Neill as Mr. Tuthill
 Frankie Darro as James "Jimmy" Rivers
 John Wray as Mike Gibbons
 Edward McWade as Tim Powers
 June Travis as Mary Rand
 Ann Shoemaker as Mrs. Tuthill
 Gavin Gordon as Jack
 Spencer Charters as Boatman
 Joan Gay as Diane Nichols
 Adrian Morris as Rivet Boss

Reception
The New York Times reviewer called Stranded "a mobile drama which manages to be quite unbelievable and generally entertaining. ... The picture's chief virtue is its sense of humor."

References

External links
 
 
 
 

1935 films
1935 romantic drama films
American romantic drama films
American black-and-white films
Films based on short fiction
Films directed by Frank Borzage
Films set in San Francisco
Warner Bros. films
Films produced by Frank Borzage
1930s English-language films
1930s American films